Amy Adams is an American actress who has received various awards and nominations, including two Golden Globe Awards, four Critics' Choice Movie Awards, and a Screen Actors Guild Award. Additionally, she has been nominated for six Academy Awards and seven British Academy Film Awards. In 2017, Adams received a star on the Hollywood Walk of Fame for her contributions to the motion picture industry.

Adams' breakthrough role in the 2005 acclaimed independent comedy-drama Junebug earned her an Academy Award nomination for Best Supporting Actress, and won her the Critics' Choice Movie Award for Best Supporting Actress and the Independent Spirit Award for Best Supporting Actress. In 2007, she starred in Walt Disney Pictures' romantic musical Enchanted, for which she won the Saturn Award for Best Actress and was nominated for the Golden Globe Award for Best Actress – Motion Picture Comedy or Musical, the Critics' Choice Award for Best Actress, and three MTV Movie Awards. Adams' performances in the critically acclaimed dramas Doubt (2008), The Fighter (2010), and The Master (2012) garnered her several accolades, including nominations from the Oscar, Hollywood Foreign Press, BAFTA, SAG, and Critics' Choice award ceremonies.

Since 2013, Adams has received two People's Choice and four Teen Choice Awards nominations for her role as Lois Lane in the DC Extended Universe. For her performance as a con artist in the 2013 crime comedy-drama American Hustle, Adams won the Golden Globe Award for Best Actress – Motion Picture Comedy or Musical and the Critics' Choice Movie Award for Best Actress in a Comedy, and received her first Academy Award for Best Actress nomination. The following year, she starred as Margaret Keane in the autobiographical drama Big Eyes, which won her a second consecutive Golden Globe Award for Best Actress – Motion Picture Comedy or Musical, making her the fourth actress to achieve this feat. She also received her second nomination for the BAFTA Award for Best Actress in a Leading Role for her portrayal. In 2016, Adams won the National Board of Review Award for Best Actress, and was nominated for the Golden Globe Award, the SAG Award, the BAFTA Award, and the Critic's Choice Award for Best Actress, for playing a linguist in the science fiction film Arrival.

Academy Awards
The Academy Awards are a set of awards given by the Academy of Motion Picture Arts and Sciences annually for excellence of cinematic achievements. Adams has received six nominations, tying her with Deborah Kerr and Thelma Ritter as the actresses with the second most nominations without winning (surpassed only by Glenn Close, who has eight nominations).

AACTA International Awards
The Australian Academy of Cinema and Television Arts Awards are presented annually by the Australian Academy of Cinema and Television Arts (AACTA) to recognize and honor achievements in the film and television industry.

British Academy Film Awards
The British Academy Film Award is an annual award show presented by the British Academy of Film and Television Arts.

Critics' Choice Movie Awards
The Critics' Choice Movie Awards are presented annually since 1995 by the Broadcast Film Critics Association for outstanding achievements in the cinema industry.

Critics' Choice Television Awards
The Critics' Choice Television Awards are presented annually since 2011 by the Broadcast Television Journalists Association. The awards were launched "to enhance access for broadcast journalists covering the television industry".

Dorian Awards
The Dorian Awards are organized by the Gay and Lesbian Entertainment Critics Association (GALECA).

Empire Awards
The Empire Awards is a British awards ceremony held annually to recognize cinematic achievements.

Golden Globe Awards
The Golden Globe Award is an accolade bestowed by the 93 members of the Hollywood Foreign Press Association (HFPA) recognizing excellence in film and television, both domestic and foreign.

Golden Raspberry Awards
The Golden Raspberry Awards is a parody awards show honoring the worst of cinematic under-achievements.

Gotham Awards
Presented by the Independent Filmmaker Project, the Gotham Awards award the best in independent film.

Hollywood Film Festival
The Hollywood Film Awards are held annually to recognize talent in the film industry.

Independent Spirit Awards
The Independent Spirit Awards are presented annually by Film Independent, to award best in the independent film community.

Irish Film & Television Awards
The Irish Film & Television Academy Awards are presented annually to award best in films and television.

MTV Movie Awards
The MTV Movie Awards is an annual award show presented by MTV to honor outstanding achievements in films. Founded in 1992, the winners of the awards are decided online by the audience.

Nickelodeon Kids' Choice Awards
The Nickelodeon Kids' Choice Awards, also known as the Kids Choice Awards (KCAs), is an annual awards show that airs on the Nickelodeon cable channel that honors the year's biggest television, film, and music acts, as voted by Nickelodeon viewers.

Palm Springs International Film Festival
Founded in 1989 in Palm Springs, California, the Palm Springs International Film Festival is held annually in January.

People's Choice Awards
The People's Choice Awards is an American awards show recognizing the people and the work of popular culture. The show has been held annually since 1975, and is voted on by the general public.

Primetime Emmy Awards
The Primetime Emmy Awards are presented annually by the Academy of Television Arts & Sciences, also known as the Television Academy, to recognize and honor achievements in the television industry.

Satellite Awards
The Satellite Awards are a set of annual awards given by the International Press Academy.

Saturn Awards
The Saturn Awards are presented annually by the Academy of Science Fiction, Fantasy and Horror Films to honor science fiction, fantasy, and horror films, television, and home video.

Screen Actors Guild Awards
The Screen Actors Guild Awards are organized by the Screen Actors Guild‐American Federation of Television and Radio Artists. First awarded in 1995, the awards aim to recognize excellent achievements in film and television.

Sundance Film Festival
The Sundance Film Festival is the largest film festival held annually in United States.

Television Critics Association Awards
The TCA Awards are awards presented by the Television Critics Association in recognition of excellence in television.

Teen Choice Awards
The Teen Choice Awards is an annual awards show that airs on the Fox Network. The awards honor the year's biggest achievements in music, movies, sports, television, fashion, and other categories, voted by teen viewers.

Other awards
This is to include awards which are not related to any particular movie or project.

Critics associations

Notes

References

Adams, Amy